Coke Stevenson Reed is an American mathematician and inventor from Austin, Texas.  He is the inventor of the proprietary Data Vortex network. Implementations of this network into Supercomputers use a novel topology and switch logic based on his and Krystyna Kuperberg's solution to a problem posed by Stan Ulam in the Scottish Book.

Coke completed his Ph.D. at the University of Texas at Austin under Hubert Stanley Wall.

Biography
Dr. Coke Stevenson Reed is an American mathematician and the inventor and Founder of Data Vortex Technologies, a privately held US company composed largely of former members of the United States defense community.

In his work with the Department of Defense and Department of Energy, Reed developed a thorough understanding of the existing pitfalls of computer networks and performance. His career has included positions at the Institute for Defense Analyses, Los Alamos National Laboratories, the United States Space Program, and the Microelectronics and Computer Technology Corporation. At Los Alamos, Reed worked in Physics and mathematics. Reed received his PhD in 1966 under Dr. Hubert S. Wall at the University of Texas at Austin. His academic appointments have included the University of Texas, Auburn University, Georgia Tech, the University of Colorado Boulder, and Princeton University.

His contributions to national security were recognized in 1990 by the Department of Defense when he was awarded the Exceptionally Meritorious Civilian Service Award Medal.

By the time Reed arrived at the University of Colorado in the early 1990s, he had adopted the study of such Eastern philosophies as Taoism. He embraced the philosophy of clearing one's mind and finding the answers to life's toughest problems through nature. The mathematical discovery of the Data Vortex came to him while in the Rocky Mountains - a sudden thought seemingly out of the blue. It was a dynamical system of three-dimensional Euclidean space that could move data, congestion-free.

Through this revolutionary technology, Reed aims to break national security and big data analytics away from the confines of traditional computing with the creation and implementation of a revolutionary high performance computing network. Since 1995, he has authored over 30 patents on the Data Vortex network. Data Vortex validation systems are presently housed at leading research institutions and organizations within the United States Government and academia.

Presently, Reed is working on implementation of the Data Vortex in novel spaces, such as exploration into knowledge-based computing, shared memory, and streaming dynamic graph analysis.

References 

1940 births
Living people
20th-century American mathematicians
American computer scientists
University of Texas at Austin College of Natural Sciences alumni
People from Austin, Texas
Place of birth missing (living people)
21st-century American mathematicians